Squash competitions at the 2019 Pan American Games in Lima, Peru are scheduled to be held between July 25 and 31, 2019 at the CAR Voleibol en la Videna.

7 medal events are scheduled to be contested, a singles, doubles and team event for each gender along with a mixed doubles event. This will be the first time the mixed doubles event has been contested at the Pan American Games.

Medalists

Medal table

Men's events

Women's events

Mixed events

Participating nations
A total of 13 countries qualified athletes. The number of athletes a nation entered is in parentheses beside the name of the country. Bermuda made its debut in squash at the Pan American Games.

Qualification

A total of 60 squash athletes (36 men and 24 women) qualified to compete. Each nation may enter a maximum of 6 athletes (three per gender). The host nation, Peru automatically qualified the maximum team size. The top eleven men's team (of three athletes) and top seven women's teams (of three athletes), excluding Peru, at the 2018 Pan American Championships also qualified.

References

External links
Results book

 
Events at the 2019 Pan American Games
Pan American Games
2019